Oscar Ling Cartwright (April 12, 1900 – March 21, 1983) was an American entomologist who specialized in scarab beetles. He is commemorated in the scarab genus Cartwrightia as well as 16 insect species.

References

1900 births
1983 deaths
American entomologists
20th-century American zoologists
Coleopterists